Rebecca Dora Sieff borb Rebecca Doro Marks (23 February 1890 – 8 January 1966) was an British Zionist who was one of the founders of the Women's International Zionist Organization

Life 
Sieff was born in Leeds in 1890. Her parents were Hannah (born Cohen) and Michael Marks. Her mother couldn't write when she was born and her father became a successful businessperson. He founded Marks & Spencer in 1903. They all lived in Msnchester and Rebecca attended Manchester High School for Girls followed by the University of Manchester. She studied English Litereature and her husband was an economics student named Israel Moses Sieff.

During the First World War, Sieff was active in charitable organizations that collected donations for the Jewish population of Poland (Charity Fund for Polish Jewry). In 1918 she was elected to the Council of the English Zionist Federation, being one of only three women elected to that body directly, and not as representatives of subordinate groups. In the same year she took part in founding the Federation of Women Zionists (FWZ).

She and her husband both separately visited Palestine in preparation fulfilling the Balfour Declaration. Sieff was there with Vera Weizmann and Edith Eder and they were surprised by the poor living conditions and she decided that they needed a women's organisation and a college of domestic economy in Jerusalem. Weizman was a doctor and she believed that the women were working too equally as they did not have the strength of men. Sieff had been brought up to expect men to take the lead but she believed that women could better support the family by improving their traditional roles.

She was involved in the formation of the Women's International Zionist Organization (WIZO), In 1919 she and Vera Weizmann, Olga Alman, and Romana Goodman persuaded the English Zionist Federation that a separate organisation for women was required. Sieff was the first President of the new organisation. 

In 1921 she was in Carlsbad as a part of the British delegation to the WIZO conference.

In 1949 the Women's International Zionist Organization moved its location to Israel and Sieff became its new president.

In 1956 her home was bombed and her gardener was killed.

Sieff died in Tel Aviv in 1966 just after her husband was made a life peer.

Marriage and family

In 1910, she married Israel Sieff (later Baron Sieff). They had three sons and a daughter:

Hon. Michael David Sieff  (1911–1987)
Marcus Sieff, Baron Sieff of Brimpton  (1913–2001) 
Daniel Sieff (1915–1932)
Judith Hannah Sieff (1921–1999)

The tragic death of their son Daniel, who intended to be a scientist, at age 17 led Sieff — and with the financial support of his business partners and relatives by marriage, the Marks and Sacher families — to endow the 1934 creation, by Chaim Weizmann, of the Daniel Sieff Research Institute in Rehovot in present-day Israel. Renamed the Weizmann Institute of Science in 1949 with the Sieff family's consent, it became Israel's premier research university in the natural sciences.

References 

1890 births
1966 deaths
People from Manchester
British Zionists